= Ulaidh =

Ulaidh may refer to:

- Ulaid, a medieval over-kingdom (also known as a province) in north-eastern Ireland, which is spelt as Ulaidh in modern Irish.
- Ulster, one of the four traditional provinces of Ireland, located in the north of the island, and which is known as Ulaidh in Irish.
